State Route 348 (SR 348) is a  state highway in western Greene County, Tennessee. It serves the town of Mosheim and the communities of Midway, McDonald, Mohawk and Warrensburg.

Route description
SR 348 begins at an intersection with SR 340 (Fish Hatchery Road) in extreme western Greene County. It begins as McDonald Road and goes east toward Midway and like most roads in eastern Tennessee it is rather curvy. Before the route reaches Midway it passes through a small community called McDonald, it has only a volunteer fire department and an elementary School and of course some houses. In Midway SR 348 comes to an intersection with Midway Railroad Street which goes east and SR 348 turns south for a very short time and comes to a three-way intersection at which McDonald Road ends, Little Chuckey Road goes south and SR 348 turns east onto Midway Road. In Midway the route passes through Midway's "downtown" area. SR 348 passes over a railroad line and enters Mosheim city limits and passes West Greene High School and comes to an end at an intersection with US 11E/SR 34.

Major intersections

References

External links
 

Transportation in Greene County, Tennessee
348